The videography of the South Korean group Red Velvet consists of twenty-nine music videos and two video albums.

Music videos

Video albums

Other videos

References 

Videographies of South Korean artists
videography